The arrowtooth flounder (Atheresthes stomas) is a fish in the family Pleuronectidae. It can be caught from the Bering Sea to Santa Rosa Island, California. At present, it is the most common fish in the Gulf of Alaska. Data is insufficient for many of the flounder's general traits, including size and age of sexual maturity. Spawning is known to occur from December through February and the species can live up to 27 years.

If not properly handled, the flesh of an arrowtooth flounder can soften, due to a proteolytic enzyme which is emitted from a myxosporean parasite that softens the flesh when heated, lowering value and marketability.  To make it more marketable, arrowtooth is usually sold on the West Coast as turbot, although it is not related to the true turbot. Additives have been created to combat the softening of flesh, creating economic feasibility for the catching of the flounder.

References

External links
  
 Commercial Utilization of Arrowtooth Flounder

arrowtooth flounder
Fish of the Bering Sea
Fauna of Western Canada
Fauna of the Northwestern United States
Commercial fish
arrowtooth flounder
Taxa named by David Starr Jordan